Immiserizing growth is a theoretical situation first proposed by Jagdish Bhagwati, in 1958, where economic growth could result in a country being worse off than before the growth. If growth is heavily export based, it might lead to a fall in the terms of trade of the exporting country. In rare circumstances, this fall in the terms of trade may be so large as to outweigh the gains from growth.  If so, this situation would cause a country to be worse off after growth than before. This result is only valid if the growing country is able to influence world prices. Harry G. Johnson had, independently, worked out conditions for this result in 1955.

References 

Economic growth
Paradoxes in economics